Pleasanton is a city in Decatur County, Iowa, United States. The population was 32 at the time of the 2020 census.

History
Pleasanton was founded in 1854. It was originally called Pleasant Plain, but the name was changed to avoid confusion with another community of that same name in the state. The present name is commendatory.

Geography
Pleasanton is located at  (40.580274, -93.743142).

Demographics

2010 census
As of the census of 2010, there were 49 people, 18 households, and 14 families living in the city. The racial makeup of the city was 100.0% White.

There were 18 households, of which 27.8% had children under the age of 18 living with them, 66.7% were married couples living together, 11.1% had a female householder with no husband present, and 22.2% were non-families. 22.2% of all households were made up of individuals. The average household size was 2.72 and the average family size was 3.07.

The median age in the city was 34.5 years. 28.6% of residents were under the age of 18; 4.2% were between the ages of 18 and 24; 22.4% were from 25 to 44; 24.4% were from 45 to 64; and 20.4% were 65 years of age or older. The gender makeup of the city was 55.1% male and 44.9% female.

2000 census
As of the census of 2000, there were 37 people, 20 households, and 12 families living in the city. The racial makeup of the city was 100.00% White.

There were 20 households, out of which 15.0% had children under the age of 18 living with them, 55.0% were married couples living together, 5.0% had a female householder with no husband present, and 40.0% were non-families. 40.0% of all households were made up of individuals, and 25.0% had someone living alone who was 65 years of age or older. The average household size was 1.85 and the average family size was 2.42.

In the city, the population was spread out, with 10.8% under the age of 18, 8.1% from 18 to 24, 13.5% from 25 to 44, 35.1% from 45 to 64, and 32.4% who were 65 years of age or older. The median age was 58 years. For every 100 females, there were 105.6 males. For every 100 females age 18 and over, there were 94.1 males.

The median income for a household in the city was $51,250, and the median income for a family was $54,375. Males had a median income of $51,250 versus $18,750 for females. The per capita income for the city was $29,231. There were no families and 12.5% of the population living below the poverty line, including no under eighteens and 16.7% of those over 64.

Education
The Central Decatur Community School District operates local area public schools.

References

Cities in Iowa
Cities in Decatur County, Iowa
Populated places established in 1854
1854 establishments in Iowa